The expressways of Singapore are special roads that allow motorists to travel quickly from one urban area to another. Construction of the system was authorized when construction of the Pan Island Expressway began in 1962. All of them are dual carriageways with grade-separated access. They usually have three to four lanes in each direction, although there are two-lane carriageways at many expressway intersections and five-lane carriageways in some places. There are ten expressways. Studies about the feasibility of additional expressways are ongoing.

Construction on the first expressway, the Pan Island Expressway, started in 1966.

The Singaporean expressway networks are connected with Malaysian expressway networks via Ayer Rajah Expressway (connects with the Second Link Expressway in Malaysia) and Bukit Timah Expressway (connects with the Johor Bahru Eastern Dispersal Link Expressway via Johor–Singapore Causeway).

History

Expansion 
The latest expressway completed is the 5 km Marina Coastal Expressway (MCE), which links the East Coast Parkway and Kallang-Paya Lebar Expressway to Marina South and Ayer Rajah Expressway and includes Singapore's first undersea tunnel. Construction started in 2008 and the expressway opened to traffic 29 December 2013.  Prior to construction of the Marina Coastal Expressway, the Kallang–Paya Lebar Expressway which runs for 12 km, 9 km of which are 10 m underground, was started in 2001 and a 3 km section linking the Pan Island Expressway and East Coast Parkway was opened in late 2007. The Kallang–Paya Lebar Expressway was completed on 20 September 2008.

Construction of the 11th expressway, the North–South Corridor, originally conceptualised as the North-South Expressway was announced on 30 January 2008. The new 21.5-kilometre expressway will cost about $7 to $8 billion when fully completed by 2026 and will connect the East Coast Parkway with the northern parts of Singapore. In 2016, the Land Transport Authority announced that the North–South Corridor will be Singapore’s first integrated transport corridor featuring continuous bus lanes and cycling trunk routes, rather than a normal expressway when originally conceptualised.

Features 
Like all other global controlled-access expressway network, there are no traffic lights on the expressways. At an interchange with another road, an expressway is connected to it via slip roads. This allows traffic to change routes without having to stop or slow down. Due to the need to conserve space in land-scarce Singapore, there are no cloverleaf interchanges on the entire island as they are too large. Instead, traffic efficiency and land space are maximized by having traffic lights on terrestrial roads, as well as the usage of interchanges such as stack interchanges. The most common forms of highway-road or highway-highway intersections are single-point urban, diamond, and trumpet interchanges. Newer expressways such as the Kallang-Paya Lebar Expressway and the future North South Corridor uses on-ramps and off-ramps to conserve space even further and minimize disruption to the road system, through the construction of viaducts and tunnels.

The road surface is asphalt, unlike normal roads which may have concrete surfaces. The lanes are separated with white dashed lines, while unbroken white lines are used to mark the edges of the median and shoulder. The shoulder is reserved for stops due to breakdowns and emergencies, and motorists are prohibited by law from travelling on it. Lanes are numbered from right to left, with lane 1 being the closest to the median. Crash barriers, cat's eyes and rumble strips are also used to ensure road safety.

There are signs marking the start and end of an expressway at its entry and exit points respectively. The expressways are also assigned route codes consisting three letters that form their respective initials, making the Singaporean expressway network as the only highway system with route coding system. The Expressway Monitoring and Advisory System is used on all the expressways—cameras are used for live monitoring of expressway conditions, and LED signboards display information messages, such as warnings of any disruptions to the normal flow of traffic, as well as estimated travel times.

Singaporean expressways are the only highway network in Singapore with their own route codes. They are assigned with three-letter codes named after their respective initials where the last letter is always E; for example, PIE for the Pan Island Expressway. The only exception is the East Coast Parkway (ECP) whose the last letter is other than E.

Safety 
Speed traps are also deployed by the Singapore police at many places along the expressways and are deployed from 7am to 12am.

Certain types of transport, such as pedestrians, bicycles, and learner drivers, are not allowed.

List of Expressways

Semi-expressways 
Singapore also has five semi-expressways: Bukit Timah Road, Jurong Island Highway, Nicoll Highway, the Outer Ring Road System (ORRS) and West Coast Highway. These semi-expressways are scaled down versions of expressways, without a uniform speed limit. Some sections still feature traffic light controlled junctions, such as the eastern section of the ORRS, some of Bukit Timah Road, the southern section of the Jurong Island Highway and the western sections of Nicoll Highway and West Coast Highway. However, much like with the expressways, semi-expressways allow motorists to travel quickly from one urban area to another with the use of viaducts, overpasses and tunnels.

See also 

 Land Transport Authority
 Ministry of Transport (Singapore)

References 

 http://www.lta.gov.sg
 https://web.archive.org/web/20081106151957/http://www.kpeunderground.sg/

 
Expressways